The Rural Municipality of Eye Hill No. 382 is a rural municipality (RM) in the Canadian province of Saskatchewan within Census Division No. 13 and  Division No. 6. It is located in the west-central portion of the province adjacent to the Alberta boundary.

History 
The RM of Eye Hill No. 382 incorporated as a rural municipality on December 12, 1910.

Geography

Communities and localities 
The following urban municipalities are surrounded by the RM.

Towns
 Macklin

Villages
 Denzil

The following unincorporated communities are within the RM.

Special service areas
 Primate

Localities
 Evesham (dissolved as a village, August 3, 2000)
 Grosswerder
 Hillam

Demographics 

Government 
The RM of Eye Hill No. 382 is governed by an elected municipal council and an appointed administrator that meets on the first Wednesday after the first Monday of every month. The reeve of the RM is Robert Brost while its administrator is Jason Pilat. The RM's office is located in Macklin.

Transportation 
Rail
C.P.R. Outlook Kerrobert Branch—serves Macklin, Primate, Denzil, Salvador, Luseland.
C.P.R Minnedosa, Saskatoon Edmonton Section—serves Rutland, Senlac, Evesham, Macklin, Hayter, Provost

Roads
Highway 14—serves Evesham, and Macklin.
Highway 17—serves Macklin to Onion Lake
Highway 317—serves Cactus Lake to Primate
Highway 31—serves Macklin, Primate, Denzil
Highway 676—serves Denzil to the north
Abercrombe Road, Saskatchewan—North and south road west of Evesham

References 

E

Division No. 13, Saskatchewan